Arch of Triumph may refer to:

 Triumphal arch, a monumental structure in the shape of an arch

Structures
 Arc de Triomf, an 1888 structure in Barcelona, Spain
 Arc de Triomphe, an 1836 structure in the Place Charles de Gaulle, Paris, France
 Arc de Triomphe du Carrousel, an 1808 structure in Paris, France
 Arcul de Triumf, a 1936 structure in Bucharest, Romania
 Arch of Triumph (Pyongyang), a 1982 structure in Pyongyang, North Korea
 Monumental Arch of Palmyra, a 3rd-century Roman ornamental archway in Syria
 Siegestor, an 1852 three-arched triumphal structure
 Triumphal Arch, Chișinău, an 1841 structure in Moldova
 Triumphal Arch of Orange (27 BC–AD 14), the oldest surviving triple-arched Roman triumphal arch

Media
 Arch of Triumph (novel), a 1945 Erich Maria Remarque novel
 Arch of Triumph (1948 film), a 1948 American film
 Arch of Triumph (1984 film), a 1984 British TV film, remake of the 1948 film